Bukwanga Kiki (also known as Bukwangakiki) was a Basoga chiefdom in what is today Uganda. It was founded around 1737 and lasted until the end of the 19th century, when it came under British rule.

References
Genealogical Gleanings

Busoga